"The Middle" is a song by Russian-German record producer Zedd, American country singer Maren Morris and American musical duo Grey. It was written by Sarah Aarons, Zedd, Grey and The Monsters and the Strangerz, with production handled by the latter three. The song was released commercially for digital download and streaming on 23 January 2018 by Interscope Records. It reached the top ten of the charts in the US, the UK and several other countries. It was nominated for Record of the Year, Song of the Year and Best Pop Duo/Group Performance at the 61st Annual Grammy Awards.

Background and development

Release
The song was first revealed in an accompanying interview of Zedd's cover shot for Billboard, published on 10 August 2017. Zedd played interviewer Chris Martins unreleased material in a studio, one of which was "The Middle", which featured co-writer Sarah Aarons as a demo singer.

On 11 January 2018, Zedd teased the song on social media, saying: "Hey guys, it's that time again. I wanted to show you a preview to my brand new song. Check it out," after which he played a short snippet of the song. The collaboration was officially announced via social media on 19 January 2018, along with the single artwork, which Zedd teased a day earlier without a title on it.

Collaboration
Zedd explained in a press release that they "worked really hard on this record to get it just right". He also opened up about the opportunity to work with both collaborators, saying that working with Maren Morris was "super fun because she is clearly an amazing singer and very talented musician", and that he loves working with Grey because they strive to "make the best music possible".

Morris added: "Zedd was so great to work with and so easy-going, it felt like we'd been working together for years. The sound is reflective of my many influences as an artist – a little bit country, little pop, little R&B, relatable, emotional and catchy as hell. There are no limits with this song and I can't wait to see how the fans react." She revealed in a statement that she recorded her vocal for the song with Zedd in Nashville "several weeks ago" before the song's release. Grey admitted that they faced a few obstacles during production, but they "kept fighting for it" because the song was special.

Vocal demos
Demi Lovato, Camila Cabello, Anne-Marie, Carly Rae Jepsen, Tove Lo, Bishop Briggs, Bebe Rexha, Lauren Jauregui, Daya, Charli XCX, Elle King, Elley Duhé and Lennon Stella all recorded demos of the song before Morris' version was selected.

Stefan Johnson, one-fifth of production team The Monsters and the Strangerz, stated that "it was a super long process." Jordan Johnson of the same team added: "We never lost the feeling for that song. Even a year later, I, as a creator hadn't gotten tired of it. It was special." 

The first iteration of the song (before Zedd and Grey were attached) was intended to be a single for Lovato, but she passed after deciding the song was "too pop" and opted to release "Sorry Not Sorry" instead. Once Zedd and Grey were brought on board, Cabello's version was selected but she pulled out two weeks prior to the song's release in order to focus on promoting "Havana". After Cabello backed out, Anne-Marie's version was chosen but she had to back out due to conflicts stemming from the release of "Friends". After plans to release Anne-Marie's version fell through, the production team discovered that Morris has recorded a version but that it was never reviewed when initially submitted for consideration. Once the production team heard Morris' version, it was selected for the final cut.

Rexha's demo leaked online in 2018, Cabello's demo leaked in 2020 while Lovato's and XCX's demos leaked in 2021. Briggs' demo and Sarah Aarons' original demo have also leaked online.

Critical reception
Kat Bein of Billboard opined that the song is "relatively sparse with cute, lively flourishes", writing that it has "definite sonic similarities" to Zedd's previous song "Stay". Rolling Stones Brittney McKenna deemed the song "an infectious earworm" in which Morris "strays from her country roots". She felt that the "Nineties R&B-indebted, vocoder-driven chorus" recalls the sound of "Stay", and that Morris "deftly occupies the new, poppy space". Hugh McIntyre of Fuse found Morris' appearance on the track surprising, "considering the genres she primarily works in", as he praised Morris for "supplying vocals perfectly". He felt that it "leans a lot more pop than electro", which makes the song more appealing to a broader variety of listeners. Regarding the song "an easy-to-love electronic smash" and "a slightly reductive mix" of "Stay" and "Starving", he noted that it is "not entirely original" due to its "reminiscence of what the musicians have delivered before". Similarly, Madeline Roth of MTV News called the song "a poppy earworm" and a combination of "Stay" and "Starving", which is "catchy as hell and practically destined for radio domination". Mike Nied of Idolator wrote that the song "blends elements of country and EDM" and praised Morris for providing "impassioned vocals". Billy Dukes of Taste of Country described the song as "an unlikely combination of EDM, '90s pop and modern country music".

Music video
The song's music video, directed by Dave Meyers, was premiered via Target's commercial space during the 60th Annual Grammy Awards. On 25 April, Zedd released a vertical video on YouTube. The dancing was choreographed by Nadine "Hi-Hat" Ruffin, with 50 dancers featured including Lele Pons, Jade Chynoweth, and Willdabeast Adams. More than 400 extras worked on the video.

Live performances
On 28 April 2018, Zedd and Maren Morris performed the song live for the first time at the Omnia nightclub in Las Vegas. On 20 May 2018, all three artists performed the song at the 2018 Billboard Music Awards. Morris performed the song with Taylor Swift at the Arlington stop of Swift's Reputation Stadium Tour on 5 October 2018. On 26 October 2019, Jess Moskaluke and The Hunter Brothers performed the song at the opening ceremonies of the 2019 NHL Heritage Classic in Regina, Saskatchewan, located roughly midway between the home cities of the participating Calgary Flames and Winnipeg Jets along the Trans-Canada Highway.

Awards and nominations

Commercial performance
The song reached No. 5 on Billboard Hot 100. As of February 2019, it had sold 771,000 copies in the United States. In January 2021, "The Middle" surpassed 1 billion streams on Spotify, the first song to do so for all three artists.

Track listings
Digital download
"The Middle" – 3:04

CD single
"The Middle" – 3:05
"The Middle"  – 3:02

Digital download - Remixes
"The Middle (Marc Benjamin Remix)" - 3:45 
"The Middle (Bougenvilla Remix)" - 3:54
"The Middle (Curbi Remix)" - 4:11
"The Middle (UNKWN Remix)" - 3:01
"The Middle (Maliboux Remix)" - 3:53

Personnel
Credits adapted from Tidal.
 Zedd – production, mixing
 Grey – production, mixing
 The Monsters and the Strangerz – production
 Tom Norris – mixing

Charts

Weekly charts

Year-end charts

Decade-end charts

Certifications

Release history

See also
List of number-one songs of 2018 (Singapore)
List of number-one adult contemporary singles of 2018 (U.S.)
List of Billboard Mainstream Top 40 number-one songs of 2018

References

External links
 

2018 songs
2018 singles
Zedd songs
Maren Morris songs
Interscope Records singles
Music videos directed by Dave Meyers (director)
Number-one singles in Singapore
Songs written by Sarah Aarons
Songs written by Zedd
Song recordings produced by the Monsters & Strangerz
Songs written by Jordan Johnson (songwriter)
Songs written by Stefan Johnson
Songs written by Marcus Lomax
APRA Award winners
Dance-pop songs